Thornaby was a parliamentary constituency centred on the former borough of Thornaby-on-Tees in Teesside.  It returned one Member of Parliament (MP) to the House of Commons of the Parliament of the United Kingdom.

The constituency was created for the February 1974 general election, mostly from the old seat of Middlesbrough West. It was abolished for the 1983 general election.

Boundaries
The County Borough of Teesside wards of Acklam, Ayresome, Gresham, Linthorpe, Thornaby East, and Thornaby West.

Members of Parliament

Results

Elections in the 1970s

References

Parliamentary constituencies in North East England (historic)
Constituencies of the Parliament of the United Kingdom established in 1974
Constituencies of the Parliament of the United Kingdom disestablished in 1983